The Cowboy and the Indians is a 1949 American Western film directed by John English and written by Dwight Cummins and Dorothy Yost. The film stars Gene Autry, Sheila Ryan, Frank Richards, Hank Patterson, Jay Silverheels and Claudia Drake. The film was released on September 15, 1949, by Columbia Pictures.

Plot
Rancher Gene Autry is affected by the plight of reservation Indians suffering from malnutrition and being exploited by an Indian Agency trading post operator.

Cast
Gene Autry as Gene Autry
Sheila Ryan as Dr. Nan Palmer
Frank Richards as Smiley Martin
Hank Patterson as Tom Garber
Jay Silverheels as Lakohna
Claudia Drake as Lucy Broken Arm
Georgie Nokes as Rona
Charles Stevens as Broken Arm
Alex Frazer as Fred Bradley
Clayton Moore as Luke
Frank Lackteen as Blue Eagle
Chief Yowlachie as Chief Long Arrow
Lee Roberts as Joe
Nolan Leary as Sheriff Don Payne
Maudie Prickett as Miss Summers
Harry Mackin as Bob Collins
Charles Quigley as Henderson
Gilbert Alonzo as Lucy's son
Roy Gordon as Congressman Lawrence
Champion as Champ

References

External links
 

1949 films
1940s English-language films
American Western (genre) films
1949 Western (genre) films
Columbia Pictures films
Films directed by John English
American black-and-white films
1940s American films